The 2003 UAW-GM Quality 500 was the 31st stock car race of the 2003 NASCAR Winston Cup Series season and the 44th iteration of the event. The race was held on Saturday, October 11, 2003, before a crowd of 160,000 in Concord, North Carolina, at Lowe's Motor Speedway, a 1.5 miles (2.4 km) permanent quad-oval. The race took the scheduled 334 laps to complete. At race's end, Tony Stewart, driving for Joe Gibbs Racing, would make a late race pass on Penske Racing South driver Ryan Newman with eight to go to win his 17th career NASCAR Winston Cup Series victory and his second and final win of the season. To fill out the podium, Ryan Newman and Hendrick Motorsports driver Jimmie Johnson would finish second and third, respectively.

Background 

Lowe's Motor Speedway is a motorsports complex located in Concord, North Carolina, United States 13 miles from Charlotte, North Carolina. The complex features a 1.5 miles (2.4 km) quad oval track that hosts NASCAR racing including the prestigious Coca-Cola 600 on Memorial Day weekend and the NEXTEL All-Star Challenge, as well as the UAW-GM Quality 500. The speedway was built in 1959 by Bruton Smith and is considered the home track for NASCAR with many race teams located in the Charlotte area. The track is owned and operated by Speedway Motorsports Inc. (SMI) with Marcus G. Smith (son of Bruton Smith) as track president.

Entry list 

 (R) denotes rookie driver.

Practice 
Originally, three practice sessions were planned to be held, with one on Thursday, October 9, and two on Friday, October 10. However, due to rain, the second session on Saturday was cancelled.

First practice 
The first practice session was held on Thursday, October 9, at 2:20 PM EST. The session would last for two hours.

Second and final practice 
The final practice session, sometimes referred to as Happy Hour, was held on Friday, October 10, at 4:00 PM EST. The session would last for 45 minutes.

Qualifying 
Qualifying was held on Thursday, October 9, at 7:05 PM EST. Each driver would have two laps to set a fastest time; the fastest of the two would count as their official qualifying lap. Positions 1-36 would be decided on time, while positions 37-43 would be based on provisionals. Six spots are awarded by the use of provisionals based on owner's points. The seventh is awarded to a past champion who has not otherwise qualified for the race. If no past champ needs the provisional, the next team in the owner points will be awarded a provisional.

Four drivers would fail to qualify: Ken Schrader, Hermie Sadler, Mark Green, and Jeff Fultz.

Full qualifying results

Race results

References 

2003 NASCAR Winston Cup Series
NASCAR races at Charlotte Motor Speedway
October 2003 sports events in the United States
2003 in sports in North Carolina